The Niagara Falls are rapids of the Waikawa River on the South Island in New Zealand.

A surveyor named them ironically because the falls share little in resemblance with the Niagara Falls on the border between the US and Canada. They are rather considered to be the smallest falls in The Catlins. The falls are a potential spawning area for īnanga.

References

Waterfalls of New Zealand
Landforms of Southland, New Zealand
The Catlins
Southland District